KQTE 1450 AM is a radio station licensed to Helendale, California.  The station was launched in June 2011 by Dr. Charles W. Love, and originally aired an oldies and classic country format. Charles Love died March 9, 2016, and the license was transferred to his wife, Deanna Love. On February 1, 2017, KQTE went silent. The station was subsequently sold to Jeff Chang, who also owns and operates television stations in California (San Francisco and Monterey) and Colorado (Grand Junction). The station resumed broadcasting in February 2018, and flipped from its existing format to all-sports from ESPN Radio on March 1, 2018.

References

External links

QTE
Victorville, California
Mass media in San Bernardino County, California